HMS Lyme Regis was a  built for the Royal Navy during the Second World War.

Design and description
The Bangor class was designed as a small minesweeper that could be easily built in large numbers by civilian shipyards; as steam turbines were difficult to manufacture, the ships were designed to accept a wide variety of engines. The ship's complement consisted of 60 officers and ratings.

She was powered by two Parsons geared steam turbines, each driving one shaft, using steam provided by two Admiralty three-drum boilers.

The turbine-powered Bangors were armed with a 12-pounder  anti-aircraft gun and a single QF 2-pounder (4 cm) AA gun. In some ships the 2-pounder was replaced a single or twin  20 mm Oerlikon AA gun, while most ships were fitted with four additional single Oerlikon mounts over the course of the war. For escort work, her minesweeping gear could be exchanged for around 40 depth charges.

Construction and career
Ordered in late 1939, Lyme Regis was launched on 19 March 1942 and commissioned on 5 June 1942. Originally named HMS Sunderland, she was renamed after the original Lyme Regis, her sister ship, was transferred to the Royal Indian Navy and became . Lyme Regis was sold for scrap on 24 August 1948 and was scrapped at Sunderland.

References

Bibliography
 

 

 

Bangor-class minesweepers of the Royal Navy
Ships built on the River Clyde
1942 ships
World War II minesweepers of the United Kingdom